Adrian Leon Barišić (born 19 July 2001) is a Bosnian professional footballer who plays as a centre-back for Croatian Football League club Osijek.

Barišić started his professional career at Osijek, who loaned him to Frosinone in 2022.

Club career

Early career
Barišić started playing football at Croatian club Hajduk Split, before joining Dinamo Zagreb's youth academy in 2014. A year later, he moved to Split's youth setup. In 2018, he switched to Osijek's youth academy. He made his professional debut against Varaždin on 2 May 2021 at the age of 19.

In January 2022, he was loaned to Italian side Frosinone until the end of season. On 12 March, he scored his first professional goal in a triumph over Alessandria.

International career
Barišić represented Bosnia and Herzegovina at various youth levels.

Career statistics

Club

References

External links

2001 births
Living people
Footballers from Stuttgart
Footballers from Baden-Württemberg
German people of Bosnia and Herzegovina descent
Citizens of Bosnia and Herzegovina through descent
Bosnia and Herzegovina footballers
Bosnia and Herzegovina youth international footballers
Bosnia and Herzegovina under-21 international footballers
Bosnia and Herzegovina expatriate footballers
Association football central defenders
NK Osijek players
Frosinone Calcio players
Croatian Football League players
Serie B players
Expatriate footballers in Croatia
Expatriate footballers in Italy
Bosnia and Herzegovina expatriate sportspeople in Croatia
Bosnia and Herzegovina expatriate sportspeople in Italy